Chung Thị Thanh Lan (born 17 January 1962) is a Vietnamese swimmer. She competed in the women's 100 metre freestyle at the 1980 Summer Olympics. She was the first woman to represent Vietnam at the Olympics.

References

External links
 

1962 births
Living people
Olympic swimmers of Vietnam
Swimmers at the 1980 Summer Olympics
Place of birth missing (living people)
Vietnamese female freestyle swimmers
21st-century Vietnamese women